Calosoma guineense is a species of ground beetle in the subfamily of Carabinae. It was described by Imhoff in 1843.

References

guineense
Beetles described in 1843